Steven Lyle Doll (December 9, 1960 – March 22, 2009) was an American professional wrestler, best known for his tenure in the World Wrestling Federation (WWF) as Steven Dunn in the tag team Well Dunn.

Professional wrestling career

Early career (1985–1993) 
Doll began training in 1984 with retired wrestlers Rick and John Davidson. In May 1985, he debuted for Mid South Wrestling against Dick Slater in Shreveport, Louisiana. He was half of a jobber tag team that wrestled the Blade Runners (Sting and Warrior) in their first match in the Universal Wrestling Federation (UWF) in 1985. He wrestled for Pacific Northwest Wrestling (PNW) from 1987 to 1992,  winning a total of four Pacific Northwest Heavyweight titles and eighteen Pacific Northwest Tag Team titles in teams with Scott Peterson, Jimmy Jack Funk, Crush, The Grappler, and Rex King. With Peterson, Doll formed The Southern Rockers in 1987.  Rex King joined him in the Southern Rockers when Scott Peterson left wrestling in 1989. As a tag team they wrestled together for over a decade, including when they signed together with the WWF, becoming known as Steven Dunn and Timothy Well, known then as Well Dunn.

World Wrestling Federation (1993–1995) 
Steve Doll joined the World Wrestling Federation in 1993 alongside his Southern Rocker teammate Rex King, and they became known as Well Dunn (Steven Dunn and Timothy Well) and were managed by Harvey Wippleman. Their gimmick was essentially made as heel male strippers with thongs and bowties included. They were used primarily as an undercard tag team but feuded with The Bushwhackers on several episodes of Monday Night Raw. He left WWF in early 1995 along with King due to injuries.

World Championship Wrestling (1996) 
Steve Doll was wrestling The Mauler on WCW Monday Nitro when Scott Hall made his return to World Championship Wrestling (WCW) to start the nWo angle on May 27, 1996. He was a jobber who left the company later that year.

United States Wrestling Association (1996–1997) 
Doll went to the United States Wrestling Association as Steven Dunn. He defeated Doomsday for the USWA Southern Heavyweight Championship. He was the last wrestler to hold that distinction until the USWA folded in 1997.

Later career (1997–2003) 
Post USWA he went on to form a well regarded tag team with Reno Riggins known as The Tennessee Volz. They primarily competed in Music City Wrestling, which was syndicated throughout the United States, but would also appear in various promotions in KY, TN and IN. Their matches and promos on Music City Wrestling television were often the highlight of the program. Doll went to the New Age Wrestling Alliance, in 1999, teaming up with Adam Rose. They defeated the tag team champions, CJ Stardust and Chris Alexander, in Crossville Tennessee. He retired from wrestling in 2003.

Personal life
In May 2006, Doll was hospitalized after having a seizure related to an intestinal blockage. He underwent successful surgery at Baptist Hospital in Nashville, Tennessee.

On March 22, 2009, Doll died in his sleep after a blood clot from his lung reached his heart; he was 48 years old.

Championships and accomplishments
Music City Wrestling
NWA North American Tag Team Championship (4 times) - with Reno Riggins (3 time) and Rex King (1 time)
NWA World Tag Team Championship (1 time) - with Reno Riggins
NWA Main Event
NWA North American Tag Team Championship (3 times) - with Reno Riggins
NWA Southwest
NWA Texas Heavyweight Championship (1 time)
Pacific Northwest Wrestling
NWA Pacific Northwest Heavyweight Championship (4 times)
NWA Pacific Northwest Tag Team Championship (18 times) - with Scott Peterson (7 times), Rex King (4 times), Scotty the Body (1 time), Jimmy Jack Funk (1 time), Brian Adams (1 time), and The Grappler (4 times)
Ring Around The Northwest Newsletter
Tag Team of the Year (1987–1989) with Scott Peterson
Wrestler of the Year (1991)
United States Wrestling Association
USWA Heavyweight Championship (1 time)
USWA World Tag Team Championship (8 times) - with Rex King (5 times), Flash Flanagan (2 times), and Paul Diamond (1 time)
World Wrestling Council
WWC World Tag Team Championship (1 time) - with Rex King

See also
 List of premature professional wrestling deaths

References

External links 
 

1960 births
2009 deaths
American male professional wrestlers
People from Dallas
Professional wrestlers from Texas
USWA World Tag Team Champions
NWA World Tag Team Champions
20th-century professional wrestlers
21st-century professional wrestlers